Anywhere Real Estate Inc., formerly Realogy, is an American publicly owned real estate services company. It owns and franchises several real estate brands and brokerages, and offers consumer programs, lead generation, relocation, and title settlement services.

History 
In 2005, Cendant split off all but its car rental interests into separate companies. Realogy was formed to group its real estate activities; shares in the new company were distributed to existing Cendant shareholders. In late 2006, it was bought for $6.65 billion, plus debt and other liabilities, by Apollo Global Management, a private equity group.

The company was listed on the New York Stock Exchange in 2012; 40 million shares were sold at $27 each, raising US$1.08 billion.

In 2013, the company moved its head office from Parsippany-Troy Hills, New Jersey to Madison, New Jersey. Ryan Schneider succeeded Richard A. Smith as chief executive officer in 2017.

In May 2022, Realogy announced that the company would be changing its name from Realogy Holdings Corp. to Anywhere Real Estate Inc. It went into effect on 9 June 2022.

Brands 

 Better Homes and Gardens Real Estate
 Cartus
 Century 21 Real Estate
 Coldwell Banker
 Coldwell Banker Commercial ®
 Corcoran Group
 ERA Real Estate (founded as Electronic Realty Associates Inc.)
 Sotheby's International Realty

References

Real estate companies established in 2006
Realogy brands
Companies based in Morris County, New Jersey
Real estate services companies of the United States
2012 initial public offerings
Companies listed on the New York Stock Exchange
Corporate spin-offs
2007 mergers and acquisitions